Below is a list of all the teams that ever have, or will, play in the Premier Development League or USL League Two.

References